Bud is a Romanian surname. Notable people with the surname include:

Cristian Bud (born 1985), Romanian footballer
Tit Bud (1846–1917), Romanian priest, author, folklorist, translator, historian, and aristocrat

Romanian-language surnames